Cara Black and Irina Selyutina were the defending champions, but both players turned 18 years old during the season and, therefore, were not eligible to compete in Juniors.

Eva Dyrberg and Jelena Kostanić defeated Petra Rampre and Iroda Tulyaganova in the final, 6–2, 7–6(7–5) to win the girls' doubles tennis title at the 1998 Wimbledon Championships. It was the 1st Grand Slam title for both players in their respective Junior doubles careers. Dyrberg would also win the US Open at the same year, teaming up with Kim Clijsters.

Seeds

  Leanne Baker /  Rewa Hudson (first round)
  Eleni Daniilidou /  Tina Pisnik (quarterfinals, withdrew)
  Kim Clijsters /  Jelena Dokic (first round)
  Kildine Chevalier /  Zsófia Gubacsi (first round)

Draw

Draw

References

External links

Girls' Doubles
Wimbledon Championship by year – Girls' doubles